Terro may refer to:

 Terro Ant Bait, a brand of pesticide based on borax
 Alaaeddine Terro (born 1953), Lebanese politician